Scaly Bark Creek is a stream in Johnson County in the U.S. state of Missouri. It is a tributary of Big Creek.

The stream source is at  approximately 1.5 miles north of the community of Medford.

The creek was named for the condition of the bark of the hickory trees lining its course.

See also
List of rivers of Missouri

References

Rivers of Johnson County, Missouri
Rivers of Missouri